Cloud Control was an Australian alternative rock band, originating from the Blue Mountains near Sydney, Australia. The band was signed to the Australian record label Ivy League Records, on which they released their first album, Bliss Release. They were also signed to Infectious Music in the UK and Europe, Humming Records in Germany, and to Votiv in North America. 

The band supported a number of local and international acts, including Arcade Fire, Vampire Weekend, Supergrass, The Magic Numbers, Yves Klein Blue, The Temper Trap, Last Dinosaurs, Local Natives and Weezer. The band were nominated for awards in Australia, including two ARIA Awards. The band won the Australian Music Prize on 3 March 2011 for Bliss Release.

History
Growing up in the Blue Mountains, the four members of Cloud Control met at the rehearsals for The Pirates of Penzance. 
They entered their first "Battle of the Bands", which they subsequently won. They recorded and released their debut EP, Cloud Control, in November 2007. The single "Death Cloud", was picked up by the Australian youth radio station Triple J and received strong airplay.

After a string of festival appearances and tours with a variety of Australian bands, the band released its first album, Bliss Release, in 2010. They recorded the album in the house of their producer, Liam Judson. Two singles were released from the album, "Gold Canary" and "There's Nothing in the Water We Can't Fight". The latter appeared at number 18 in the Triple J Hottest 100 of 2010. The single "Gold Canary" was voted as Single of the Week in the Rebel Playlist on the UK's BBC Radio 6 Music 2010.

The band supported Foo Fighters along with You Am I at their 2011 concert for flood relief in Brisbane, Queensland.

Their song "Just for Now" was used in the 2012 movie Magic Mike.

Their second album, Dream Cave, was released on 9 August 2013.

On 3 January 2015, the bass guitarist, Jeremy Kelshaw, announced his departure from the group on the band's Facebook page.

The band's fourth studio album, Zone was released on 1 September 2017. Their label said the album was written in a small beach house near the NSW regional centre of Forster and has been described as "profound, but also flippant, euphoric, but conceptual". The album peaked at number 53 on the ARIA Charts.

The band has been largely inactive since 2018. Alister Wright has begun a new project, Vlossom, while Heidi Lenffer has pursued entrepreneurial work as the leader of FEAT.

Band members
Final line-up
 Alister ("Al") Wright – lead vocals, guitar (2005–2018)
 Heidi Lenffer – keyboards, backing vocals, percussion (2005–2018)
 Ulrich Lenffer –  drums, percussion, backing vocals (2005–2018)
 Doug Wright – bass guitar (2017–2018)

Past members
 Jeremy Kelshaw – bass guitar, backing vocals, percussion (2005–2015)

Discography

Studio albums

Extended plays

Singles

Awards and nominations

AIR Awards
The Australian Independent Record Awards (commonly known informally as AIR Awards) is an annual awards night to recognise, promote and celebrate the success of Australia's Independent Music sector.

|-
| rowspan="3"| AIR Awards of 2010
| rowspan="2" | themselves 
| Best Independent Artist
| 
|-
| Breakthrough Independent Artist
| 
|-
| Bliss Release 
| Best Independent Album
| 
|-

ARIA Music Awards
The ARIA Music Awards is an annual awards ceremony that recognises excellence, innovation, and achievement across all genres of Australian music. Cloud Control were nominated for two awards.

|-
| rowspan="2"| 2010
| rowspan="2"| Bliss Release
| Breakthrough Artist
| 
|-
| Best Rock Album
| 
|-

Australian Music Prize
The Australian Music Prize (the AMP) is an annual award of $30,000 given to an Australian band or solo artist in recognition of the merit of an album released during the year of award.

|-
| 2010
| Bliss Release
| Australian Music Prize
| 
|-
| 2013
| Dream Cave
| Australian Music Prize
| 
|-

J Awards
The J Awards are an annual series of Australian music awards that were established by the Australian Broadcasting Corporation's youth-focused radio station Triple J.

|-
| J Awards of 2010
| Bliss Release
| Australian Album of the Year
| 
|-
| J Awards of 2013
| Dream Cave
| Australian Album of the Year
| 
|-

References

Australian indie rock groups
Musical groups established in 2007
Musical groups disestablished in 2018
Infectious Music artists